Jaques Lazier (born January 25, 1971) is an American former race car driver. He is the younger brother of 1996 Indianapolis 500 champion Buddy Lazier and son of former Indy racer Bob Lazier.

Racing career
The younger Lazier ran in U.S. Formula Ford competition from 1989 to 1997 and also drove part-time in Indy Lights in 1997. In 1998, he made his first attempt at the Indianapolis 500 in a car owned by Price Cobb but failed to qualify. He planned to join the IRL IndyCar Series full-time in 1999 for his own team but failed to qualify for races at both the Phoenix International Raceway and at the Indy 500.  He moved to the new Truscelli Team Racing the week after the Indy 500 and made his first start at Texas Motor Speedway. He finished 7th three times late in the season. He made his first Indy 500 start in 2000 for Truscelli although the team shut down later that season, again leaving Lazier without a ride.

In 2001 Lazier drove for four different teams including TeamXtreme and Sam Schmidt Motorsports, he got his best chance with Team Menard, replacing Greg Ray.  He won his second start for the team at Chicagoland Speedway.  He drove for Menard for the first four races of the 2002 season but was replaced by Raul Boesel for the Indy 500 and did not drive the rest of the season, due to injuries suffered in a crash at Nazareth Speedway. In 2003 he returned to Team Menard but again was let go, this time after the Indy 500. He signed on with A. J. Foyt Enterprises for the next four races, but funds failed to materialize for the remainder of the season and he was left on the sidelines.

Lazier entered the 2004 season without a ride, but was the relief driver for Robby Gordon in the Indy 500 as he had to leave for Charlotte to drive in the Coca-Cola 600. Later that season he made eight starts for Patrick Racing after Al Unser Jr. retired and posted several good results, but again was ride-less entering 2005.  He struck a deal with the new Playa del Racing team to contest the Indy 500 but their funds were good only for that race.  When veteran owner Chip Ganassi fired  British driver Darren Manning, he called on Lazier to replace him for the remaining oval races of the season.  While with the team he was involved in an incident with rookie fan favorite Danica Patrick at the final race at California Speedway.  The two touched and set off an accident, whereupon some reports claimed Patrick "gave Lazier a love tap".  Rahal Letterman Racing, Patrick's team, put out a press release saying Patrick had only told Lazier to mind his business in the future.  Without a full-time ride in 2006, Lazier returned to the 2007 Indy 500 with Playa Del Racing. He led for the first time at Indy for two laps when he stayed out on the track when the leaders pitted. However, he crashed late in the race and finished 27th. Lazier, while actively seeking a ride in the series, was unable to find one until he stepped in for the struggling Stanton Barrett at Team 3G at Texas Motor Speedway in 2009. He drove in the next race as well and made four more oval starts for the team later in the year. His 13th place at Iowa Speedway was his best IndyCar finish since 2004.

Motorsports career results

SCCA National Championship Runoffs

American open–wheel racing results
(key) (Races in bold indicate pole position)

IndyCar Series

 1 Relieved Robby Gordon.

Indianapolis 500

External links
 Audio Interview with Jaques Lazier Jaques Lazier direct from Gasoline Alley
 YouTube interview
 Driver Database profile
 
 Champcar Stats
 Indy Lights stats
 Indycar Profile
 Articles and pictures at Motorsport.com

IndyCar Series drivers
Lazier,Jaques
Indy Lights drivers
1971 births
Living people
Racing drivers from Denver
SCCA National Championship Runoffs winners
Trans-Am Series drivers
Chip Ganassi Racing drivers
Arrow McLaren SP drivers
A. J. Foyt Enterprises drivers